Caroline Viau (born 29 October 1971) is a Canadian para-alpine skier. She represented Canada at the 1992 Winter Paralympics. In total, she won one gold medal and two bronze medals.

She won the gold medal in the Women's Super-G LW5/7,6/8 event and the bronze medals in the Women's Downhill LW5/7,6/8 and Women's Giant Slalom LW5/7,6/8 events.

She was awarded the Queen Elizabeth II Diamond Jubilee Medal in 2013.

In 2017, Viau hosted the Opening Ceremony of the 2017 VISTA Conference in Toronto, Canada alongside Paralympian, Rob Snoek.

Achievements

See also 
 List of Paralympic medalists in alpine skiing

References

External links 
 
 

Living people
1971 births
Place of birth missing (living people)
Paralympic alpine skiers of Canada
Canadian female alpine skiers
Canadian amputees
Alpine skiers at the 1992 Winter Paralympics
Medalists at the 1992 Winter Paralympics
Paralympic gold medalists for Canada
Paralympic bronze medalists for Canada
Paralympic medalists in alpine skiing
20th-century Canadian women
21st-century Canadian women